BullSequana is the brand name of a range of high performance computer systems produced by Atos.

The range includes

 BullSequana S series - a modular compute platform optimised for AI and GPU-intensive tasks.
 BullSequana X series - supercomputers which are claimed to operate at exascale

References

Computer systems